Aasulv Olsen Bryggesaa (25 April 1856 – 3 April 1922) was a Norwegian politician for the Liberal Party.

He was elected to the Norwegian Parliament from the constituency Lister og Mandal amt in 1900, and was re-elected on four consecutive occasions. When the second cabinet Knudsen assumed office on 31 January 1913, Bryggesaa was appointed Minister of Education and Church Affairs. He left cabinet on 25 October 1915.

Born in Eiken, he was a member of Hægebostad municipal council and served as mayor for some time. For an unknown period he was a member of the county committee, a forerunner of the county council.

He took a teacher's education in Holt in 1877. From 1878 he worked on the family farm Bryggesaa in Eiken. He also worked as a teacher in Hægebostad for six years. In addition he served on various public committees, both locally and nationally.

References

1856 births
1922 deaths
Government ministers of Norway
Members of the Storting
Liberal Party (Norway) politicians
Mayors of places in Vest-Agder
Ministers of Education of Norway